Delaware County Community College (DCCC) is a public community college with campuses and facilities throughout Delaware and Chester Counties in Pennsylvania. DCCC was founded in 1967 and is accredited by the Middle States Commission on Higher Education. The college offers 53 associate degree programs and 43 certificate programs at nine different locations.

DCCC's athletic teams compete in Division III of the National Junior College Athletic Association (NJCAA) and are members of the Eastern Pennsylvania Athletic Conference. They are collectively known as the Phantoms and have won two men's basketball championships.

In 2021, DCCC was named a Center of Excellence for Domestic Maritime Workforce Training and Education for preparing students for U.S. maritime industry careers.

History

Early years
The origin of DCCC can be traced back to 1963, when Pennsylvania legislature permitted the establishment of state community colleges through the Community College Act of 1963.

In 1964, when the Delaware County Council for Higher Education was formed, Delaware County residents were presented with a survey, the results of which showed they wanted a community college in the area. The council subsequently assigned a task force to identify a permanent location for the college. Simultaneously, Delaware County commissioners were supporting the potential expansion of Pennsylvania State University (PSU) into the area. Despite the debate over which school would have a presence in Delaware County, Pennsylvania's board of education approved the establishment of DCCC in January 1967. (That year, Penn State Brandywine was established in Delaware County as an extension of PSU).

Although DCCC was officially founded on March 1, 1967, it did not yet have its own facility. Under the leadership of DCCC's first president Dr. Douglas F. Libby Jr., classes commenced in September at Ridley Township High School with 307 students enrolled. Once DCCC had an established board of trustees, a committee was appointed to continue searching for a permanent site for the college.

By 1968, additional DCCC classes were temporarily being held at the Fair Acres Delaware County Institution District and the Dante School, a former orphanage in Concordville, Pennsylvania. After delays caused by legal disputes over building a permanent facility in Delaware County, DCCC entered into an agreement of sale with the heirs to the Gideon Stull estate in May 1968. Following the agreement, DCCC submitted an application to the Marple Township Planning Commission and Zoning Board requesting exception from residential zoning. Upon denial of its request, DCCC appealed the board's decision, which led to a Pennsylvania Supreme Court ruling in DCCC's favor in July 1969. That same month, DCCC officially closed on the Gideon Stull estate for approximately $1.25 million.

By 1974, the $18.5 million Academic Building and Learning Support Building were fully constructed. DCCC's Marple Campus was dedicated in November.

Presidents
Following Dr. Libby's retirement, Dr. Richard D. DeCosmo served as DCCC's second president from 1980 until his retirement in 2003. Under his leadership, new skills-based degree and certificate programs were added to those established during Dr. Libby's administration. Additionally, Dr. DeCosmo advocated for improved economic conditions for Delaware County though access to adult basic education, GED preparation and skill training. To accomplish this, he requested reduced Pell Grant eligibility requirements to make higher education accessible to the increased percentage of Delaware County residents living below the poverty level.

Before his 2003 appointment as the third president, Dr. Jerome S. Parker had served as a DCCC staff member since 1977. As president, he pushed for updated facilities and technical training at DCCC to advance the college and continue its mission to improve the local community's economy. Five additional campuses in Delaware and Chester Counties were opened and DCCC built alliances with companies such as Aker Philadelphia Shipyard, Boeing and Sunoco to prepare students for open industry positions. Dr. Parker is credited with playing a major role in the development of DCCC's Advanced Technology Center, which was named after him upon his retirement in 2017 (see Campus section below).

Since 2017, Dr. L. Joy Gates Black has served as the current president of DCCC. She is the first African-American female to serve in this position at the college. In 2019, DCCC and the Archdiocese of Philadelphia signed a $3 million agreement of sale, which will allot space for the construction of a new DCCC campus at Monsignor Bonner & Archbishop Prendergast Catholic High School. The campus is set to tentatively open in spring 2022 and will integrate the Southeast and Upper Darby Centers (see Campus section below). In 2020, Dr. Gates Black was recognized for founding DCCC's first Center for Equity and Social Justice.

Campus
DCCC has nine locations. All except Chester County Hospital offer all of the following: a bookstore, career and counseling center, an Enrollment Central for student assistance services, disability services, student lounges, study areas and a Learning Commons that offers tutoring and technology support to the DCCC community. The degree and certificate programs offered vary by location.

Delaware County Campuses

Marple Campus 
Marple Campus is the main campus of DCCC. Opened in 1974, it houses DCCC's radio station, baseball and soccer field and basketball and tennis courts. Marple Campus is also the home of DCCC's municipal police academy, which has trained more than 95 percent of all Delaware County and 75 percent of all Chester County police officers for the last 40 years.

The four main buildings on Marple Campus are Founders Hall, the Academic Building, the STEM Center and the Jerome S. Parker Advanced Technology Center.

Founders Hall houses most of DCCC's administrative offices, a cafeteria and the Learning Commons. Also located in Founders Hall are Enrollment Central and the Nazz Mariani Veterans Center for veterans programs.

The Academic Building is the largest main building on Marple Campus. It contains the Student Center for campus life activities, the Career and Counseling Center, art studios, an art gallery, an auditorium for theater and other large events, faculty offices and PA CareerLink®.

The STEM Center and Advanced Technology Center are a part of the $60 million STEM Complex that opened during the 2009–2010 academic year. The STEM Center is a four-story,  building that houses classrooms, a fitness center, aerobics studio, computer lounge and café. It shares 23 science and specialized laboratories with the Advanced Technology Center. The Advanced Technology Center is a  building that houses classrooms and laboratories for DCCC's technical programs.

Southeast Center 
The Southeast Center campus is located in the Folcroft Business Park near Academy Park High School in Sharon Hill, Pennsylvania. It spans . The campus opened in 2004 with 15 general and computer classrooms, a self-service café and dining area and social services.

Upper Darby Center 
The Upper Darby Center campus is located behind the Barclay Square Shopping Center on Garrett Road in Upper Darby, Pennsylvania. The campus opened in 2012 and has six classrooms. It has the capacity to serve up to 1,800 students each year.

Chester County Campuses

Exton Center 
The Exton Center campus is located in Whiteland Business Park in Exton, Pennsylvania. Opened in 1996, the campus expanded to two buildings in 2000 due to high enrollment.

Chester County Hospital 
DCCC has partnered with Chester County Hospital since 1998 to offer nursing education to Chester County residents at the hospital. The hospital is located in West Chester, Pennsylvania.

Downingtown Campus 
Downingtown Campus is located on the site of the former Downingtown Industrial and Agricultural School on Route 322 in Downingtown, Pennsylvania. Opened in 2002, the $12.5 million facility has  of space, laboratories and nine general classrooms. In 2018, the  STEM Wing opened and offers eight additional classrooms for DCCC's STEM programs.

Pennocks Bridge Campus 
Pennocks Bridge Campus is located in West Grove, Pennsylvania. It was opened in 2008 and shares  of space with the Chester County Intermediate Unit's (CCIU) Technical College High School West Grove. The building contains general classrooms, laboratories and workshops for students.

Brandywine Center 
The Brandywine Center campus is located on Boot Road in Downingtown, Pennsylvania. The campus partners with the CCIU to offer career and technical education programs as well as college credit courses to students of Technical College High School Brandywine.

Phoenixville Campus 
Phoenixville Campus is located on Charlestown Road in Phoenixville, Pennsylvania. It was opened in 2013 and shares space with CCIU's Technical College High School Pickering.

Administration and organization
DCCC operates under five academic divisions: Allied Health & Nursing; Business, Computing & Social Science; Communications, Arts & Humanities; Science, Technology, Engineering and Math; and Workforce Development & Economic Development.

A typical academic year is broken up into two 10-week terms during the fall (August–December) and spring (January–May). Within the terms are two seven-week accelerated sessions. The winter term is one month long for online classes only. The full summer term is 12 weeks long (May–August). Within the term are two accelerated sessions that each last approximately five weeks. An academic year begins on the first day of the fall term and ends on the last day of the summer term.

DCCC's endowment had a market value of approximately $2.19 million in the fiscal year that ended in 2019.

Sponsoring school districts

DCCC is partially funded through tax programs maintained by the respective school districts of Delaware County: 
 Chester Upland School District
 Garnet Valley School District (Bethel residents only)
 Haverford Township School District
 Interboro School District
 Radnor Township School District
 Ridley School District
 Rose Tree Media School District
 Southeast Delco School District
 Springfield School District
 Upper Darby School District
 Wallingford-Swarthmore School District (Swarthmore and Rutledge residents only)
 William Penn School District
School district sponsorship allows students and residents of each sponsoring school district to access DCCC's courses and degree programs for a reduced tuition rate.

Academics and programs
DCCC has an open admissions policy and accepts life experience as credits. In addition to its associate and certificate degree programs, DCCC offers non-credit enrichment, job training and certification courses through its Continuing Education program.

DCCC has dual admissions agreements with several four-year universities in the Philadelphia area that allow students to automatically transfer after completing an associate degree. Villanova University offers a Guaranteed Admissions program and West Chester University and Temple University each offer a Letter of Intent Program.

DCCC has one of the largest KEYS (Keystone Education Yields Success) programs in the state of Pennsylvania. The government-funded program helps students who are Temporary Assistance for Needy Families (TANF) and/or Supplemental Nutrition Assistance Program (SNAP) recipients achieve their career and economic goals.

Student Life

Student Body
As of fall 2019, DCCC's student body consists of 10,073 students. There are 27 percent full time and 73 percent part-time students.

Organizations
More than 30 student clubs and organizations operate at DCCC, including student government, special interest and service organizations.

Cultural groups on campus include: American Sign Language Club, Black Student Union, Campus Bible Fellowship, LatinX Student Association, LGBTQ+ Club, Multicultural Club and Mutual Africa. The Sexuality and Gender Awareness (SAGA) Club is headquartered at the Pennocks Bridge campus.

Publications
The Communitarian, DCCC's independent student-alumni newspaper, originally began as a mimeographed sheet in 1967. It is published four times each semester and features work by current and former students of the Fundamentals of Journalism courses offered at DCCC.

Pegasus, a student-run literary magazine published each spring, features literary works by DCCC students.

The Student Writing Journal, a peer reviewed online journal, features superior academic works by DCCC students.

DCCC's New Media Lab houses three podcast productions that feature DCCC news and events (This Must Be Heard), readings of students' literary and nonfiction works (The Written) and discussions of popular forms of entertainment (Study Break).

Athletics
The DCCC athletic teams have been known as the Phantoms since 1967, when students and faculty helped select the school's mascot.

The DCCC athletic association chairs eight varsity athletic programs, which are open to full-time students and any part-time students who have completed at least 30 credit hours at DCCC. The Phantoms belong to the Eastern Pennsylvania Athletic Conference and Region 19 of the NJCAA. Men's sports include: baseball, basketball, golf and soccer. Women's sports include: basketball, cross country, indoor and outdoor track & field and volleyball. As of fall 2021, the women's volleyball program has returned from a hiatus that began in fall 2017.

The Phantoms became nationally affiliated with the NJCAA in 2012. The men's baseball team was the first to make the transition in March 2012 and the men's basketball team soon followed. The remaining sports teams became affiliated as of the 2012–2013 academic year.

DCCC's teams have won two conference championships in men's basketball in 1996 and 2012.

Athletic Facilities
Students, student-athletes, faculty and staff are granted access to the fitness center and programs at DCCC's Marple Campus.
Volleyball and basketball home games are played at Widener University's Schwartz Athletic Center and Penn State Brandywine's Athletic/Commons Gym.

Notable alumni
Callahan Bright, American football defensive lineman
 Ken Cage, Airplane Repo
 Dean Demopoulos, collegiate and professional basketball coach
Joe Hackett, member of the Pennsylvania House of Representatives, District 161 from 2011 to 2015
 Audra McLaughlin, The Voice Season 6 finalist

Explanatory footnotes

References

External links

Official website

Two-year colleges in the United States
Community colleges in Pennsylvania
Educational institutions established in 1967
Universities and colleges in Delaware County, Pennsylvania
Universities and colleges in Chester County, Pennsylvania